Luis Enrique Erro (January 7, 1897 – January 18, 1955) was a Mexican astronomer, politician, and educational reformer.

Born in Mexico City, Erro studied civil engineering and accounting, among other subjects.  He occupied the post of head of the Department of Technical Education until 1934.  He revamped Mexico’s system of technical education in 1932, when he established the Advanced School of Mechanical Engineers and Electricians (Escuela Superior de Ingenieros Mecánicos y Electricistas) and the Advanced School of Construction (Escuela Superior de Construcción).  He also helped create the National Polytechnic Institute in 1936. He was the President of the Chamber of Deputies in 1918.

In 1940, he was invited to become a member of the administration of President Manuel Ávila Camacho, with whom he collaborated on a project to build an observatory in Tonantzintla, Puebla, where there existed atmospheric conditions favorable for astronomical studies.  He renounced his post as director of this observatory in 1947 and returned to Mexico City, where he dedicated himself to writing articles on astronomy for the newspaper Excélsior.  As an amateur astronomer, he is also noted for his study of southern variable stars.

Due to a heart condition, he was interned for several weeks, during which time he wrote a novel, Los pies descalzos ("Bare feet"), which concerns Emiliano Zapata.  He died soon after completing this work.

Planetario Luis Enrique Erro, in Mexico City, is named after him, as is lunar crater Erro.

References

Sources
 Luis Enrique Erro

1897 births
1955 deaths
Presidents of the Chamber of Deputies (Mexico)
Mexican astronomers
People from Mexico City
20th-century astronomers